Fort is a business and art district in the city of Mumbai, Maharashtra. The area gets its name from the defensive fort, Fort George, built by the British East India Company around Bombay Castle.

The area extends from the docks in the east, to Azad Maidan in the west; Chhatrapati Shivaji Maharaj Terminus in the north to Kala Ghoda in the south. This area is the heart of the financial markets of the city & multiple British era structures are located in this neighbourhood.

History

The Fort area was declared protected under regulations of the Maharashtra Government Urban Development Department. An advisory committee now oversees the development, repairs and renovations of structures in the precinct. In 1882, Bomanjee Hormarjee Wadia Clock Tower was erected using public funds as a token of appreciation for Bomanjee Hormarjee, a Parsi philanthropist who made contributions towards improving education in Bombay. The Fort neighbourhood of Mumbai was the first part to be developed by the British. Then, over the years it stood as a reminder of India's rich colonial history, and today it is sort of a jewel in the crown of the city's cultural scene.

It had been listed as a notorious market in 2009 and 2010 by the USTR for selling counterfeit software, media and goods.

See also
Nariman Point
Colaba
Bandra Kurla Complex
CBD Belapur
Vashi

References

External links 

18th Century History of Mumbai
1860 Street in Bombay Fort

See also
List of forts in Maharashtra

Neighbourhoods in Mumbai
Central business districts in India
Notorious markets